Dąbrowa Górnicza , German: Dombrowa, is a city in Zagłębie Dąbrowskie, southern Poland, near Katowice and Sosnowiec. It is located in eastern part of the Silesian Voivodeship, on the Czarna Przemsza and Biała Przemsza rivers (tributaries of the Vistula, see Przemsza).

Even though Dąbrowa Górnicza belongs to the historic province of Lesser Poland, it now is situated in the Silesian Voivodeship (since 1999), and previously (1975–1998) it was in Katowice Voivodeship. Dąbrowa Górnicza is one of the cities of the Katowice urban area (2.7 million people), and within the greater Silesian metropolitan area (5.2 million people). The population of the city itself as of December 2021 is 116,971.

Area and districts
Dąbrowa Górnicza is the largest city of the province and the 9th largest in Poland in terms of territory, with total area of 188 square kilometers. The city lies among the hills, at 258 to 390 meters above sea level. Dąbrowa Górnicza borders Będzin County, Zawiercie County, Olkusz County and the city of Sosnowiec. At the same time it borders the cities and towns of Sosnowiec, Będzin, Siewierz and Sławków. The city is divided into several districts: Antoniów, Błędów, Bugaj, Centrum, Dziewiąty, Gołonóg, Korzeniec, Kuźniczka Nowa, Łazy Błędowskie, Łęka, Łęknice, Łosień, Marianki, Mydlice, Okradzionów, Piekło, Ratanice, Reden, Sikorka, Strzemieszyce Małe, Strzemieszyce Wielkie, Trzebiesławice, Trzydziesty, Tucznawa, Ujejsce, Ząbkowice. Furthermore, in 1977–1984 the town of Sławków was a district of Dąbrowa Górnicza.

The place name Dąbrowa, is derived from the Polish word dąb (oak), and denotes an oak grove, as the territory of the original village is believed to have been covered by oak forests back in the early days of its existence. From the 19th century, the settlement grew to be an important coal-mining center, and its name was supplemented by the adjective Górnicza (which refers to mining) in 1919, to distinguish it from such towns, as Dąbrowa Tarnowska and Dąbrowa Białostocka.

History

In the first half of the 18th century, Dąbrowa was a small agricultural settlement belonging to the Będzin parish of Lesser Poland's Kraków Voivodeship in the Lesser Poland Province of the Polish Crown. It was first mentioned on 25 July 1726, when the parish priest of Holy Trinity Church at Będzin noted a woman named Anna Lisowa from Dąbrowa. At the 1787 census of the Archdiocese of Kraków, the settlement numbered 184 inhabitants. The districts of Dąbrowa, which for centuries had been separate villages, are much older. Trzebieslawice was first mentioned in the 12th century; Błędow was mentioned by Bishop of Kraków Iwo Odrowąż in the year 1220; Strzemieszyce and Ujejsce were mentioned in the 14th century; Gołonóg

in the 15th century; while Ząbkowice was described by Jan Długosz.

After the Third Partition of Poland (1795) Dąbrowa was annexed by Prussia and incorporated into its newly formed province of New Silesia. The Prussians discovered rich deposits of coal here and the first coal mine was established by Friedrich Wilhelm von Reden in 1796. In 1799, first detailed map of this area was created, on which a settlement called Stara Dąbrowa is presented. It was located along a road from Kraków to Upper Silesia. The coal mine, established by Friedrich Reden, attracted workers, and a settlement was soon established around it. In 1807, Dąbrowa was regained by Poles and included within the short-lived Polish Duchy of Warsaw, and in 1815, after the duchy's dissolution, it became part of Russian-controlled Congress Poland. In 1846, the Cieszkowski Coal Mine was opened, named after Józef Cieszkowski. The Zinc Plant Konstanty operated as early as 1823, and the Huta Bankowa steel works, which is still in operation, was built in Dąbrowa Górnicza in 1834. First primary school was opened in 1820, and first Roman Catholic church of St. Alexander was built in the 1870s. During the January Uprising, in February 1863, Dąbrowa was captured by Polish insurgents after their victory in the Battle of Sosnowiec nearby. In 1909 the gmina of Dąbrowa Górnicza was established by Tsarist authorities. Even though its population reached 30,000, the Russians were reluctant to grant Dąbrowa town charter, so it remained a village until 18 August 1916, when Austrian authorities, which during World War I occupied southern part of Congress Poland, agreed to establish the town. After the war, in 1918, Poland regained independence and control of the city. 15 local Polish boy scouts were killed in fights for Polish independence in 1914–1920. In the Second Polish Republic, Dąbrowa belonged to Kielce Voivodeship.

In September 1939, in the beginning of World War II, the city was invaded by Germany, and shortly afterwards the German Einsatzgruppe I operated in the city and committed various crimes against the Polish population. Also in September 1939, Wehrmacht troops carried out a massacre of 14 Polish boy scouts from nearby villages in the present-day district of Tucznawa. Poles from Dąbrowa Górnicza were among the victims of massacres committed by the Germans in other places, including Sosnowiec on September 4, 1939 and Celiny on June 4, 1940. Under German occupation the city was annexed directly to Germany, and included within the Upper Silesia Province. At least 14 Polish policemen from Dąbrowa were murdered by the Russians in the large Katyn massacre in April–May 1940. Further executions of Poles were carried out by the Germans during the war. Over 40 local Polish boy and girl scouts were killed by the Germans in various places, including the Auschwitz concentration camp and during the Warsaw Uprising of 1944, and over 60 local miners were also murdered in Auschwitz. In October 1941, the occupiers expelled over 100 Poles, who were then sent to forced labour either to Germany or to various factories in the region, while their houses were handed over to German colonists as part of the Lebensraum policy. The Germans also operated the E513 and E543 forced labour subcamps of the Stalag VIII-B/344 prisoner-of-war camp at the local coal mine. More than 4000 local Jews were enclosed in a ghetto, and later murdered in death camps. German occupation ended in 1945.

Together with whole Zagłębie Dąbrowskie, the city was transferred to Katowice Voivodeship after World War II, in 1945.
 
In 1968, the local church of Saint Mary of the Angels was visited by the Primate of Poland Stefan Wyszyński and cardinal Karol Wojtyła (future Pope John Paul II). The 1970s saw the construction of the Katowice Steelworks, which is nowadays the biggest steel producing plant in Poland, after privatization owned by ArcelorMittal. In the 1970s the town expanded territorially and economically. In 1975 and 1977 the neighboring localities of Strzemieszyce Małe, Strzemieszyce Wielkie, Ząbkowice and others became suburbanized. The population of Dąbrowa Górnicza reached its peak in 1982 with 152,373 inhabitants. In 1984, the neighboring settlements of Marianki and Ratanice were included within the city limits of Dąbrowa Górnicza as new districts. In the 1990s all local coal mines were closed, because of lack of coal. But the oldest part of the town Reden still exists. In 1993, the neighboring settlement of Trzebiesławice was also included within the city limits as a new district.

Education
 Silesian Technical University, Faculty of Chemistry, Industrial and Environmental Chemistry course
 Wyższa Szkoła Biznesu
 Wyższa Szkoła Planowania Strategicznego

Transport

There are many important routes crossing in Dąbrowa Górnicza. These include expressway S1 and national road 94. Expressway S1 is a direct connection to motorway A4 and to Katowice International Airport.

Also Dąbrowa Górnicza has rich railway network access including Warsaw-Katowice line (VI Pan-European corridor) and nearby Broad Gauge Metallurgy Line terminal in Sławków. The rail network is very dense in the city as it is a branching point of former Warsaw-Vienna railway. There are nine rail stations within city limits: Dąbrowa Górnicza, Dąbrowa Górnicza Pogoria, Dąbrowa Górnicza Gołonóg, Dąbrowa Górnicza Ząbkowice, Dąbrowa Górnicza Sikorka, Dąbrowa Górnicza Strzemieszyce, Dąbrowa Górnicza Wschodnia, Dąbrowa Górnicza Huta Katowice, and Dąbrowa Górnicza Południowa. Express and fast trains stop at two stations: Dąbrowa Górnicza and Dąbrowa Górnicza Ząbkowice, all other stations serve local connections.

There is also a tram network, being part of Silesian Interurbans.

Nature

In Dąbrowa there are many green areas. Total area of local lakes is over 800 hectares, there are 180 hectares of parks (0.96%) and 4100 hectares of forests (21.7%). Particularly noteworthy is the complex of Pogoria (lakes). Also, the largest Polish desert, Błędów Desert, lies within city limits. Furthermore, part of the Eagles' Nests Landscape Park reaches the outskirts of the city. Among cultural institutions there are the Palace of Zagłębie Culture, City Museum Sztygarka, Ząbkowice House of Culture, Zagłębie Music Scene, Chamber Orchestra of Zagłębie, Film Center Helios, Music and Arts Schools.

Sports
The city's most notable sports club is basketball team MKS Dąbrowa Górnicza, which competes in the Polish Basketball League, the country's top division.

Notable people
 Karol Adamiecki (1866–1933), economist, engineer
 Aleksander Zawadzki (1899–1964), head of state of Poland in 1952–1964
 Jerzy Pławczyk (1911–1989), athlete, competed at 1932 and 1936 Summer Olympics

 Edward Babiuch (1927–2021), communist political figure
 Zdzisław Marchwicki (1927–1977), serial killer
 Kazimierz Imieliński (1929–2010), physician and father of Polish sexology
 Sobiesław Zasada (born 1930), rally driver, businessman
 Janusz Gajos (born 1939), actor
 Jerzy Janikowski (1952–2006), Olympic fencer
 Dawid Podsiadło (born 1993), singer
 Maja Chwalińska (born 2001), tennis player

Twin towns – sister cities

Dąbrowa Górnicza is twinned with:

 Alchevsk, Ukraine 
 Câmpulung Moldovenesc, Romania
 Mediaș, Romania
 Studénka, Czech Republic

References

External links

 Encyclopædia Britannica Dąbrowa Górnicza
 Jewish Community in Dąbrowa Górnicza on Virtual Shtetl
 Jewish family of Dabrowa Ghetto
 Dąbrowa Górnicza page for investors
 Forum about Dąbrowa Górnicza
 The City of Dąbrowa Górnicza
 The Dabrowa-Gornicza Ghetto part 1 Nazi movie
 The Dabrowa-Gornicza Ghetto part 2 Nazi movie
 www.dawnadabrowa.pl – history of the town
 "Here Their Stories Will Be Told..." The Valley of the Communities at Yad Vashem, Dąbrowa Górnicza, at Yad Vashem website.

 
City counties of Poland
Cities and towns in Silesian Voivodeship
Kraków Voivodeship (14th century – 1795)
Piotrków Governorate
Kielce Voivodeship (1919–1939)
Nazi war crimes in Poland